3 to Go is an Australian portmanteau film consisting of three stories (Judy, Michael, and Toula), each presenting a young Australian at a moment of decision about their future. The film was first shown on commercial television in March 1971 and episodes screened individually in cinemas as supporting shorts. One of the stories, Michael, written and directed by Peter Weir (a leading figure in the Australian New Wave cinema movement (1970–1990)), went on to receive an Australian Academy of Cinema and Television Arts award.

Plot 
Young people and their personal concerns are the main theme of the segments:

Judy 
Despite the opposition of her parents and her boyfriend, Judy, a 19-year-old country girl, wants to move to the big city and leave her small town behind. Judy finds life in Tamworth mundane - her mother's concerns about her welfare, Mike - her unambitious country boyfriend, and the daily routine. Her plan is to make her own life in Sydney, and she seeks advice from her work-friend Margie, and wishes her boyfriend was more like David (Margie's fiancé). At the Hoyts drive-in, showing a double-feature (Flaming Star and Garden of Evil), she informs Mike of her plans. He becomes disenchanted, failing to understand her motivations, and a few weeks later, after Judy searches for work in The Sydney Morning Herald, and with the help of her boss, the segment ends as she boards a train for Sydney and we see her new home (room 305).

Michael 
A young man, Michael, faces a choice between his wealthy middle-class parents and their middle class wealthy lifestyle and a group of radicals. The episode starts with close-quarter battle scenes near Sydney Harbour, where radical Youth Quake rebels are fighting against soldiers. We then learn that this is only a film-sequence, and that everyday life is still normal, and meet Michael who is living with his parents, but working in the city. The scenes are intercut with an expert Youth Quake panel discussion (led by Neville Trantor), discussing topics such as sex and drugs. Trouble with Judy his girlfriend leads to a counterculture montage, and Michael becomes increasingly bored with his work routine and colleagues. At a pub, he befriends an actor from the film, Grahame, and Georgina his girlfriend, and begins to experience their freewheeling lifestyle. Family life becomes increasingly mundane as he begins to seek something more. He invites them to gatecrash Judy's 21st party, leading to trouble with his parents and a stronger sense of personal conflict.

Toula 
In it, a young Greek woman falls for an Australian man despite the opposition of her conservative Greek parents and family. Toula lives in a row house in Sydney (within the Greek community) with her parents, grandmother, and younger brother Stavros, all of whom arrived in Australia 4.5 years ago. Toula and her best friend Assimina work at a clothes factory, and their families often meet and socialise together. Assimina has an Australian boyfriend, a university student named Rick, but she is unable to tell anyone except Toula about him - rumours however reach her brother Nick, which leads to a physical altercation in the house. Tension exists at Toula's house too, with Stavros, who is unemployed and listless, and his father's desire for him to go to university. As a community dance, she meets John - then the four go on a double-date to see Easy Rider in the theatre. Easter arrives, and the community celebrates a midnight mass with candles in the Greek Orthodox Cathedral of St. Sophia in Paddington, and the family head off home together.

Cast
Judy
Judy Morris as Judy
Serge Lazareff as Mike
Mary Ann Severne as Margaret
Gary Day as David
Penny Ramsey as Heather
Wendy Playfair as mother
Brian Anderson as father
Cliff Neale as Mr Vickery
Michael
Matthew Burton as Michael
Grahame Bond as Grahame
Peter Coville as Neville Trantor
Georgina West as Georgina
Betty Lucas as mother
Judy McBurney as Judy
Toula
Rita Ioannou as Toula
Erica Crowne as Assimina
Andrew Pappas as Stavros
Joe Hasham as John
Gabriel Battikha as Nick
Ther Coulouris as father
Ketty Coulouris as mother
Yaya Laudeas as grandmother

Production
Assistance was provided by the then Commonwealth Film Unit (now Screen Australia). Filmed in black and white, Michael was shot in late 1969 on 16mm but blown up to 35mm, while the others were filmed in early 1970 on 35mm. The director of photography was Kerry Brown, and the producer Gil Brealey, It was distributed by British Empire Films.

Music 
The music for Michael was written and played by the Cleves, a New Zealand band popular in Sydney at the time, and released in January 1970 as an EP called Music from Michael. Released by Festival Records, the tracks were:
 A1 - To-Day / Don't Turn Your Back / To-Day / Thirties / To-Day
 A2 - Merivale / Whispers
 B1 - Nowhere / Down on the Farm / Don't Turn Your Back
The music for Toula included "Mozart Chamber Music" edited by James McCarthy.

Reception

The three segments in the trilogy had "relatively little thematic or stylistic connection", apart from what might be called an ulterior, "issue-based" motive to draw lessons about life in Australia, and a desire to patch together a feature film by using a portmanteau structure.

Awards 
Michael won the 1971 AACTA Award for Best Film.

References

External links
Judy Michael Toula at NSFA Films on YouTube

3 to Go at Oz Movies
Michael at Oz Movies
Toula at Oz Movies
Judy at Oz Movies

Australian anthology films
1971 films
Australian television films
Films directed by Peter Weir
Films set in Sydney
Films directed by Brian Hannant
Films directed by Oliver Howes
1970s English-language films